A cun, often glossed as the Chinese inch, is a traditional Chinese unit of length. Its traditional measure is the width of a person's thumb at the knuckle, whereas the width of the two forefingers denotes 1.5 cun and the width of four fingers (except the thumb) side-by-side is 3 cuns. It continues to be used to chart acupuncture points on the human body, and, in various uses for traditional Chinese medicine.

The cun was part of a larger decimal system. A cun was made up of 10 fen, which depending on the period approximated lengths or widths of millet grains, and represented one-tenth of a chi ("Chinese foot"). In time the lengths were standardized, although to different values in different jurisdictions. (See  chi (unit) for details.)

In Hong Kong, using the traditional standard, it measures ~3.715 cm (~1.463 in) and is written "tsun". In the twentieth century in the Republic of China, the lengths were standardized to fit with the metric system, and in current usage in People's Republic of China and Taiwan it measures  cm (~1.312 in).

In Japan, the corresponding unit, was standardized at  mm (~3.030 cm, ~1.193 in, or ~0.09942 ft).

See also
 shaku

References

External links

 Cun measurements

Units of length
Human-based units of measurement